Jessie Sumner (July 17, 1898 – August 10, 1994) was a U.S. Representative from Illinois.

Born in Milford, Illinois, Sumner attended the public schools. She graduated from Girton School, Winnetka, Illinois, in 1916 and Smith College, Northampton, Massachusetts, in 1920. She studied law at the University of Chicago Law School, Columbia University, New York City, and Oxford University, England. She also studied briefly at the University of Wisconsin–Madison and the New York University School of Commerce in New York City.

Sumner was admitted to the bar in 1923 and practiced in Chicago, Illinois.
She was employed at the Chase National Bank in New York City in 1928. She returned to Milford, Illinois, in 1932 and resumed the practice of law. She served as county judge of Iroquois County, Illinois, in 1937. She served as director of Sumner National Bank, Sheldon, Illinois.

Sumner was elected as a Republican to the Seventy-sixth and to the three succeeding Congresses (January 3, 1939 – January 3, 1947). She was not a candidate for renomination in 1946.

She resumed position as vice president from 1938 to 1966, and president from 1966 to 1994, of Sumner National Bank. She was a resident of Milford, Illinois, until her death in Watseka, Illinois, on August 10, 1994.

See also
 Women in the United States House of Representatives

References

Sources

 Current Biography, January 1945, p. 45-48.

External links 
 

1898 births
1994 deaths
Businesspeople from Illinois
Lawyers from Chicago
Illinois state court judges
Smith College alumni
University of Chicago alumni
Columbia University alumni
University of Wisconsin–Madison alumni
New York University Stern School of Business alumni
Alumni of the University of Oxford
Female members of the United States House of Representatives
Women in Illinois politics
People from Milford, Illinois
Republican Party members of the United States House of Representatives from Illinois
20th-century American politicians
20th-century American women politicians
20th-century American businesspeople
20th-century American judges
20th-century American lawyers